Bull Sluice Lake is created by Morgan Falls Dam, a small hydroelectric dam located along the Chattahoochee River at the northern end of Sandy Springs, Georgia, and crossing the river westwards into eastern Cobb County in north metro Atlanta. Originally constructed in 1904 by Georgia Power to provide electricity for Atlanta's streetcars, it now provides enough power for about 4,400 homes. It was named for then recently deceased Georgia Power president S. Morgan Smith's mother whose maiden name was Morgan. At the time it was by far the largest hydroelectric plant in the state. In 1924 it was rebuilt as a 60 cycle plant with 15,000 kilowatts (up from the original 10,500 kW). The dam's license from the Federal Energy Regulatory Commission (FERC) was issued in May 2008, and expires in February 2039 which authorizes a capacity of 16,800 kW.

The construction of the dam changed the river upstream from a narrow river with rapids into a wetland. The wetland serves as a habitat for migrating birds, waterfowl, songbirds, beavers, muskrats, and numerous species of reptiles and amphibians.

Notes

Buildings and structures in Cobb County, Georgia
Buildings and structures in Fulton County, Georgia
Georgia Power dams
Dams in Georgia (U.S. state)
Energy infrastructure completed in 1904